Juoksengi is a locality situated in Övertorneå Municipality, Norrbotten County, Sweden with 350 inhabitants in 2010.

It is located on the Torne River, at the border with Finland, which runs through the middle of the river. On the Finnish side of the river the village Juoksenki is located. They were considered one village until the national border was drawn in 1809.

The Arctic Circle runs through Juoksengi.

Sports
The following sports clubs are located in Juoksengi:
 Polcirkeln/Svanstein FF

References

External links

Populated places in Övertorneå Municipality
Norrbotten
Populated places in Arctic Sweden